Stanisław Ożóg (11 April 1930 – 25 November 1998) was a Polish long-distance runner. He competed in the men's 10,000 metres at the 1960 Summer Olympics.

References

1930 births
1998 deaths
Athletes (track and field) at the 1960 Summer Olympics
Polish male long-distance runners
Olympic athletes of Poland
People from Lviv Oblast
People from Stanisławów Voivodeship